The Bold and the Beautiful is an American television soap opera. It was first broadcast on March 23, 1987, and airs on CBS. The following is a list of characters that first appeared in the soap in 2013. All characters were introduced by the series' executive producer and head writer Bradley Bell. They include Maya Avant, Carter Walton and Quinn Fuller.

Maya Avant

Maya Avant, portrayed by Karla Mosley, made her first appearance on January 22, 2013. Michael Logan of TV Guide announced the casting of Karla Mosley and the character in December 2012. Maya is an aspiring actress who gets a job at Dayzee's as well as an apartment that is above the coffeehouse. While working there, she meets Rick Forrester (Jacob Young), who at first does not tell her who he is. Despite various schemes by Caroline Spencer in order to keep them apart, Rick and Maya continue to enjoy being together, and he even offers her a job as a spokesperson for Hope For The Future, which Maya accepts. In early 2015, Maya's younger sister Nicole Avant was introduced and her arrival led to the reveal that Maya was transgender. Maya later became the first transgender bride to be married on daytime television when she married Rick.

Carter Walton

Carter Walton, portrayed by Lawrence Saint-Victor, made his first appearance on January 31, 2013. In July 2020, Saint-Victor was upped to series regular status.

Carter Walton came to Los Angeles to visit his adopted brother, Marcus Walton, who had also been adopted by the Forresters. Marcus proudly introduced Carter to his family, especially his wife, Dayzee Leigh. When Marcus bragged about Dayzee's organizational skills, he ran across some mysterious adoption papers. Dayzee admitted she had long ago helped a woman named Maya Avant give up her baby for adoption since Maya was being wrongly jailed for a crime. Now Maya was back and wanted her baby returned, and Dayzee felt she might be in trouble since she had allowed attorneys to handle the adoption and didn't know if money had changed hands. Carter studied the papers and informed Dayzee that Maya had a legal right to know who had adopted her baby.

Carter helped Marcus and Dayzee search for the adoptive family of Maya's daughter, only to find out that they had all died in a car crash. Later, Carter met Marcus' cousin, Rick Forrester. Rick explained that Forrester Creations had been having some problems with patents and counterfeit designs, and Marcus suggested that Rick hire Carter, since that was Carter's area of legal expertise.

Carter met Maya and asked her out, not knowing that Maya had been interested in Rick until she found out Rick was hiding his identity as a Forrester. Carter brought Maya to the Forrester mansion for a dinner party and was oblivious when Maya was uncomfortable seeing Rick with his girlfriend, Caroline Spencer. He tries to woo Maya, but she's not interested.

Caroline gets an unsuspecting Carter involved in her next scheme to break up Rick and Maya. He's cast in a web series and is surprised yet excited when he learns that Maya has been cast in the show as well, thanks to Caroline. Later, Rick and Maya break up and Carter proposes to Maya. After hesitating, she said yes. She soon hit on Rick, which angered Carter and caused their break up.

Since his split from Maya, Carter had been keeping busy with legal and celebratory work, including the weddings of Zende and Nicole (2017), Brooke and Ridge (2018), and Hope and Liam (2018). He was later involved in the latter two marriages' annulments. Also Carter legalized Steffy's adoption to a child that she named Phoebe unaware that it was Hope and Liam's daughter Beth who was kidnapped from them. Carter then officiated Hope and Thomas's wedding in 2019.

When Carter sees Zoe Buckingham at Forrester Creations, he is drawn to her and both talk about her return. He starts to fall for Zoe and tries to warn her about Thomas, but Zoe defends Thomas and declares her love for him. Carter is called to officiate Zoe and Thomas's wedding, but hoped Zoe had come to her senses. Thomas dumps a shocked Zoe at the altar for Hope. Carter feels bad for Zoe and praises her for standing up for herself. Afterwards Zoe and Carter ended up getting closer. Carter is later promoted to COO by Eric and Ridge. Carter is surprised when his friend Zende Forrester returns to L.A. He and Zende catch up, and Zende meets Zoe. What Carter does not know is that Zoe is starting to fall for Zende.

Carter and Zoe's relationship increases to where Carter gives Zoe a key to his place. Overtime, Carter began to fall more in love with Zoe that he proposed to her and she accepts. Carter then meets Zoe's sister Paris Buckingham who decided to stay in L.A for a while. Zoe tries to get Paris to leave L.A and sabotage her romance with Zende who begins to develop feelings for Paris. Zende however tells Zoe on many occasions that he will not betray Carter and he genuinely likes Paris. and his feeling with Zoe is over. Carter begins to question Zoe on why she wanted her sister to leave L.A. Ridge catches Zoe and Zende arguing and learns about the pairs feelings. Carter is heartbroken when Ridge tells him that Zoe has feeling for Zende more than he did. Zoe tries to beg for forgiveness but Carter refuses and calls off their engagement.

After his second failed engagement, Carter puts his energy in his work at Forrester Creations. Zoe tries to win Carter back even having Quinn to get through to him. Quinn talks with Carter at his place when Zoe asks her to plead her case for him. Quinn also is still dealing with consequences with her actions in trying to break up Ridge and Brooke as well as Eric refusing to be intimate with her. Quinn discussed being lonely and Eric being cold to her even though he forgave her. Quinn and Carter then kiss and have sex. The next day, they realized that it was a mistake especially since Eric is a family friend and Quinn is married to him. However, Quinn and Carter almost have sex again until Zoe stopped by his place and went into his room. Quinn hides at the bottom of the bed. When Carter tries to kick Zoe out she sees a woman's jacket. Zoe is heartbroken and leaves in tears. At work, Zoe interrupts a conversation between Quinn, Shauna and Carter. She sees the same jacket that she saw at his place. Shauna covers for Quinn and lies and says that she was the woman that Carter had slept with. Carter begs Zoe to forgive him and that he still loves her. Zoe forgives Carter but warns Shauna to stay away from him.

Zoe and Carter are engaged again, but Paris becomes suspicious of Carter. Paris then overhears Quinn and Shauna confessing and learns about Carter and Quinn. Paris confronts Quinn and Carter for betraying Zoe and Eric. Both Carter and Quinn beg Paris to not say anything. Carter then becomes guilty and tries to get Quinn to come clean to Eric. However, Quinn refuses and warns him that they would lose everything. Eric and Quinn announces that they are renewing their vows and Eric wants Carter to officiate the wedding. Brooke who wants Quinn out of Eric's life for hurting him in the past, begs Eric to not go through it. Before the wedding starts, Brooke overhears Quinn and Paris arguing and demanding her to leave. Brooke question's Paris on her argument with Quinn. Paris apologies to Brooke for not coming clean sooner, but tells her the truth. Before Eric and Quinn can say I do Brooke stops the wedding. Brooke tell Eric that Quinn has hurt him again. Eric tells Brooke to leave but Brooke call out Carter to tell Eric the truth. Carter finally confesses to Eric, which infuriates him. Eric lashes out at Quinn for hurting him again and kicks her out of the house and declares that she is fired and wants a divorce. Afterwards Paris calls Zoe and tells her the news. Off-screen, Zoe confronted Carter and calls off their engagement, and leaves L.A for Paris.

Quinn Fuller

Quinn Fuller is portrayed by General Hospital alumna and Emmy winner Rena Sofer. She plays the mother of Wyatt Spencer and is described as being "just as mysterious as her son" and "both will have secrets that can rock the entire soap." Sofer began taping on May 22 and made her debut on July 12. In August 2022, Soap Opera Digest exclusively announced that after nine years on canvas, Sofer had chosen to depart the role of Quinn and last aired on the series on August 29, 2022.

Quinn Fuller is the mother of Wyatt and owns a jewelry designer warehouse, Quinn Artisan Jewelers, in Los Angeles. When Hope Logan notices a sword necklace pendant Wyatt always wears looked eerily identical to the ones that Bill Spencer, Jr. and his son Liam always wear, she asked Wyatt where he got it from. He tells her that it was one of his mother's original designs and years ago he discovered it in a vault until she had decided to give to him. Wyatt later introduces Hope and his mother at Quinn Artisan Jewelers. Hope asks Quinn about the sword necklace, to which Quinn claims that she did indeed design the pendant, but possibly another jewelry designer had made a similar design to that certain sword, which is why Bill and Liam also wear the same sword necklace. Quinn becomes very uncomfortable with Hope's questions about the sword necklace and the Spencers. After Hope leaves Quinn tells Wyatt she is not right for him because of her high society family but Wyatt disagrees and continues to pursue Hope.
Hope and Wyatt become friends and Hope arranges for Quinn and Wyatt to have lunch at a restaurant at the same time when Bill and Liam are there. Bill immediately recognizes Quinn and she reveals that Bill is Wyatt's father. Bill and Wyatt are furious with Quinn for hiding the truth about Wyatt's paternity. Bill and Liam reach out to Wyatt but he wants nothing to do with them but eventually opens up to his father and half-brother. Bill notices that Wyatt has inherited many of the Spencer traits and similarities with Bill, making Liam very jealous especially when Wyatt takes an interest in Hope. When Bill leaves his wife Katie Logan for her sister Brooke Logan, Wyatt hears Katie's story and immediately confronts Bill becoming physical when expressing his disapproval and Bill disowns Wyatt. Wyatt returns to his mother and Quinn Artisan Jewelers where Quinn is overjoyed to have Wyatt back and sees the positive changes in him since he met Hope but she is furious at Bill for disowning Wyatt.

Brooke encourages Bill and Wyatt to see the situation from the other's perspective. Caroline tells Bill he's treating Wyatt the same way Bill Spencer Sr. treated Bill. Bill eventually accepts Wyatt again and they start to establish a father-son relationship. Wyatt and Liam continue their rivalry for the affections of Hope, who hires Quinn Artisan Jewelers to supply her newly rebranded Hope For The Future line at Forrester Creations. Quinn and Wyatt are thrilled at the opportunity to work with Forrester Creations and their company becomes internationally famous and profits enormously with the success of Hope's line. During this time Quinn begins a flirtation with Eric Forrester and secretly sends Hope a tribute video Liam made for his ex-wife Steffy Forrester which cause Hope to call off her engagement to Liam and become closer to Wyatt. Liam discovers it was Quinn who sent the video to Hope and confronts her but Quinn blames Liam for making the video and hiding it from Hope. Quinn then begins a rivalry with Donna Logan, Eric's ex-wife, both wanting Eric Forrester. However she soon starts a flirtation with Bill, who is still in love with Brooke Logan, Hope's mother. On the day of Brooke's wedding to Ridge Forrester, Bill becomes drunk and resulting in Quinn and him sleeping together. Quinn then begins a physical relationship with Deacon Sharpe, which eventually turns romantic. When Deacon proposes, Quinn begins to experience difficulties with Brooke over her objection to Quinn's involvement with Deacon. Despite Brooke's numerous attempts to split them apart, including calling upon Hope, Quinn marries Deacon at the Forrester beach house. Months later Quinn tells Wyatt that she and Deacon are separated because their marriage was doomed from the beginning since he's not a Spencer man, the only ones who have ever been able to truly capture her heart. Wyatt peppers her with questions and she says Deacon is a good man and that he went to Europe.

Quinn is later overjoyed to learn Liam and Steffy are done and tries to make sure Liam is truly done with Steffy. Liam faints from a concussion he previously suffered and Quinn drags him to his car and drives him to her remote cabin home to keep him away from Steffy. Over time, he comes to and, in order to keep him feeling safe, tells him they are a married couple named Adam and Eve Smith. While masquerading as his wife, Quinn truly opens up and falls in love with him while using his phone to further sabotage his relationship with Steffy. Deacon learns her secret and she enlists his silence and assistance. Upon learning that Wyatt and Steffy are engaged, Quinn becomes determined to keep Liam away from Steffy by throwing him off a cliff. She chooses not to in the moment and, when Deacon asks why, she pushes him off the cliff to keep Liam for herself.

As Liam begins to remember, Quinn decides to quit her job at Forrester and go away with Liam, but is left conflicted when Wyatt and Steffy move their wedding forward and she begins to worry Liam will no longer love her when he remembers their true history. Wyatt and Steffy marry on April Fool's Day in 2016, and a short time later, Wyatt finds Quinn and Liam together in the cabin. Liam begins to remember who he is and goes home with Wyatt after they lock Quinn in a cupboard. Deacon comes back and gets Quinn out of the cupboard. Quinn is eventually arrested for kidnapping Liam, but he drops the case against her after realising that he has no case.

Quinn claims that her experience with Liam has changed her (as she opened up to him about being rejected as a child by her parents) and begins to secretly romance Steffy's grandfather Eric, despite Steffy warning Quinn to stay away from her family. Eric and Quinn's relationship progresses and they eventually tell their families, with Eric's children and grandchildren objecting. Eric ends things with Quinn after Steffy issues him with an ultimatum. However, when Eric, Steffy, Liam and Wyatt go on a business trip to Monte Carlo, Quinn follows them there and resumes her relationship with Eric. Steffy catches them kissing outside a hotel, and follows her (not knowing who it is) and is shocked to find out that it is Quinn. Steffy slaps Quinn to the ground and warns her to stay away from Eric. Everyone returns to L.A., and despite objections from his family, Eric continues to romance Quinn. He asks Quinn to move in with him and they plan to get married. Thorne and Felicia come from Paris for the wedding, but Ridge and Steffy convince Wyatt and the Forresters to boycott the wedding in the hopes that Eric leaves Quinn. However, they get married, with Ivy being the only guest at the wedding.

After the wedding boycott, Eric confronts Ridge, Rick, Steffy, Thomas and Zende, and collapses in the CEO office. He is taken to hospital and it is revealed that he suffered a brain aneurysm as a result of stress and an underlying medical condition. He is in a coma for a short period of time before recovering and returning home. During this time, Ridge lies to his family and pretends to have Eric's power of attorney, kicking Quinn out of the family and the Forrester estate. When Eric wakes up from the coma, he reveals that Quinn has power of attorney and kicks Ridge out of the mansion and fires him as CEO, appointing Quinn as interim CEO in his absence. Quinn leads a successful fashion show as interim CEO, and later convinces Eric to give the CEO position to Steffy in an attempt to reunite Wyatt and Steffy (who had gone back to Liam).

Shades of the old Quinn return when she has a fantasy in which she murders her new neighbour, and rival for Eric's affections, Katie. Quinn then begins to develop feelings for Ridge after he sees her naked and takes care of her when she injures her ankle.  Quinn and Ridge attempt to keep their feelings secret but are exposed when Eric's ex-wife Sheila Carter returns to town and learns of their affair.  Sheila tells Eric in an attempt to manipulate him into divorcing Quinn. While Quinn and Ridge end their affair, Sheila continues to reinsert herself into Eric's life, manipulating Eric to let her stay in the Forrester mansion after a fight with Quinn; ultimately, Quinn exposes Sheila's schemes and Eric sends her packing.

After a period of domestic bliss, Quinn's friend Shauna Fulton arrives in Los Angeles. When Quinn discovers Shauna's attraction to Ridge, she pushes Shauna to act on it to get back at Brooke.

Eric starts distancing himself from Quinn. She seeks solace from Carter and they eventually fall in love with each other. They are eventually discovered and despite initially angry about the betrayal, Eric asks Quinn to continue sleeping with Carter as he wants her to be fulfilled as Eric has erectile dysfunction and can't satisfy Quinn in the bedroom anymore.

Eric's family discover that Quinn is still making love with Carter and try to influence Eric to split with Carter. Quinn stops the affair with Carter and Eric forgives her but still their love life is not the same.

Eric starts having a secret affair with his ex-wife Donna Logan. Quinn is worried about Eric's health so gives him a tracker bracelet that monitors his heart beat. Eric is unaware the bracelet is able to transmit his heart rate to Quinn. While in the throes of passion with Donna, Quinn sees his heart rate escalate. She tracks him down and catches him in bed with Donna.

Meanwhile Carter had been trying to get over his feelings for Quinn by getting engaged to Paris. Eric encourages Quinn to stop Carter's marriage. In a very comical scene Quinn turns up at Carter's wedding all disheveled and Carter and Quinn run into each other's arms embrace and passionately kiss to the shock of Paris and the wedding guests. Then a happy Quinn and Carter start a life together.

Others

References

, 2013
, The Bold and the Beautiful